Enrico Costa may refer to:

Enrico Costa (physicist) (born 1944), Italian astrophysicist
Enrico Costa (politician) (born 1969), Italian politician and lawyer
Enrico Costa (bobsledder) (born 1971), Italian bobsledder